The 1985 Artemio Franchi Cup was the first edition of the CONMEBOL–UEFA Cup of Champions, a football match between the winners of the previous South American and European championships. The match featured France, winners of UEFA Euro 1984, and Uruguay, winners of the 1983 Copa América. It was played at Parc des Princes in Paris, France, on 21 August 1985.

France won the match 2–0 to become the first champions of the Artemio Franchi Cup.

Teams

Match

Details

References

External links
 Artemio Franchi Trophy 1985 at RSSSF
 Match report at FootballDatabase.eu
 Match report at 11v11.com

1985
1985–86 in European football
1985 in South American football
1985–86 in French football
France national football team matches
1985 in Uruguayan football
Uruguay national football team matches
International association football competitions hosted by Paris
1985 in Paris
August 1985 sports events in Europe